Shen Gongbao (申公豹) is a major character featured within the famed classic Chinese novel Investiture of the Gods. Shen Gongbao is a disciple of Yuanshi Tianzun, Jiang Ziya's junior fellow apprentice.

Background
Shen Gongbao is good at communication, persuasion, and magic arts in general. He first appeared as a Yaojing terrorizing the Mysterious Fog Mountain. Then one day, Hongjun Laozu arrived and defeated him. He then took Shen Gongbao to Yuanshi Tianzun at Kunlun Mountain to practice Taoism so he could become a god. Later, Shen Gongbao left Kunlun Mountain to assist King Zhou of Shang to battle the Eastern Kingdom (Xiqui) and regarded Jiang Ziya as his enemy.

Finally, Shen Gongbao was arrested by his master Yuanshi Tianzun.

Shen Gongbao was appointed as the General of East Sea in the end. The General of East Sea is one of the gods who manage the East China Sea.

Film and television

Chinese television

Chinese film

Japanese television

References

Investiture of the Gods characters
Chinese gods